The 1990 Big Ten Conference football season was the 95th season of college football played by the member schools of the Big Ten Conference and was a part of the 1990 NCAA Division I-A football season.

The Iowa Hawkeyes won a four-way tie for the Big Ten Conference championship by defeating the three other teams atop the conference standings – Michigan, Michigan State, and Illinois – in their respective head-to-head matchups. The Hawkeyes earned their third trip to Pasadena in ten seasons, but lost 46-34 to Washington in the 1991 Rose Bowl.

Michigan defeated Ole Miss 35-3 in the Gator Bowl to finish 9-3 on the season. The #7 Wolverines were the highest ranked Big Ten team in the final AP poll. Joining Michigan in the final rankings were the other conference co-champions – #16 Michigan State, #18 Iowa, and #25 Illinois.

Iowa running back Nick Bell received the Chicago Tribune Silver Football trophy as the conference's most valuable player. Michigan defensive back Tripp Welborne and Illinois defensive lineman Moe Gardner were consensus first-team All-Americans for the second straight season.

Season overview

Results and team statistics

Key
AP final = Team's rank in the final AP Poll of the 1990 season
AP high = Team's highest rank in the AP Poll throughout the 1990 season
PPG = Average of points scored per game; conference leader's average displayed in bold
PAG = Average of points allowed per game; conference leader's average displayed in bold
MVP = Most valuable player as voted by players on each team as part of the voting process to determine the winner of the Chicago Tribune Silver Football trophy; trophy winner in bold

Pre-season

Regular season

Bowl games
Six Big Ten teams played in bowl games:
 Iowa lost to Washington, 46-34, in the Rose Bowl in Pasadena, California.
 Michigan defeated Ole Miss, 35-3, in the Gator Bowl in Jacksonville, Florida.
 Illinois lost to Clemson, 30-0, in the Hall of Fame Bowl in Tampa, Florida.
 Michigan State defeated USC, 17-16, in the John Hancock Bowl in El Paso, Texas.
 Indiana lost to Auburn, 27-23, in the Peach Bowl, in Atlanta, Georgia.
 Ohio State lost to Air Force, 23-11, in the Liberty Bowl in Memphis, Tennessee.

Rankings

Statistical leaders
The Big Ten's individual statistical leaders include the following:

Passing yards 
1. Jason Verduzco, Illinois (2,567)
2. Eric Hunter, Purdue (2,355)
3. Matt Rodgers, Iowa (2,228)
4. Greg Frey, Ohio State (2,062)
5. Elvis Grbac, Michigan (1,911)

Rushing yards
1. Tico Duckett, Michigan State (1,394)
2. Jon Vaughn, Michigan (1,364)
3. Vaughn Dunbar, Indiana (1,224)
4. Hyland Hickson, Michigan State (1,196)
5. Robert Smith, Ohio State (1,126)

Receiving yards
1. Desmond Howard, Michigan (1,025)
2. Shawn Wax, Illinois (863)
3. Richard Buchanan, Northwestern (834)
4. Jeff Graham, Ohio State (763)
5. Rob Turner, Indiana (717)

Total offense
1. Jason Verduzco, Illinois (2,384)
2. Eric Hunter, Purdue (2,355)
3. Matt Rodgers, Iowa (2,292)
4. Greg Frey, Ohio State (1,965)
5. Elvis Grbac, Michigan (1,928)

Passing efficiency rating
1. Elvis Grbac, Michigan (137.2)
2. Jason Verduzco, Illinois (132.5)
3. Matt Rodgers, Iowa (130.2)
4. Dan Enos, Michigan State (122.3)
5. Greg Frey, Ohio State (120.7)

Rushing yards per attempt
1. Robert Smith, Ohio State (6.4)
2. Jon Vaughn, Michigan (6.3)
3. Nick Bell, Iowa (6.1)
4. Howard Griffith, Illinois (5.5)
5. Tico Duckett, Michigan State (5.4)

Yards per reception
1. Rob Turner, Indiana (21.7)
2. Tim Ware, Wisconsin (19.7)
3. Jeff Graham, Ohio State (19.1)
4. Desmond Howard, Michigan (16.3)
5. James Bradley, Michigan State (16.2)

Points scored
1. J.D. Carlson, Michigan (95)
2. Howard Griffith, Illinois (90)
2. Hyland Hickson, Michigan State (90)
4. Nick Bell, Iowa (84)
5. Jeff Skillett, Iowa (83)

Awards and honors

All-conference players

The following players were picked by the Associated Press (AP) and/or the United Press International (UPI) as first-team players on the 1990 All-Big Ten Conference football team.

Offense

Defense

Special teams

All-Americans

At the end of the season, two Big Ten players were consensus first-team picks for the 1990 College Football All-America Team. The Big Ten's consensus All-Americans were:

Other awards

Hayden Fry of Iowa received his second Big Ten Coach of the Year award.

1991 NFL draft
The 1991 NFL Draft was held April 21-22, 1991.  The following Big Ten players were selected in the first round of the draft:

References